Alan Jenkin (born 10 December 1962) is a former Australian rules footballer who played for the St Kilda Football Club in the Victorian Football League (VFL).

Notes

External links 
		

Living people
1962 births
Australian rules footballers from Victoria (Australia)
St Kilda Football Club players
North Ballarat Football Club players